Cladonia stellaris or the star-tipped cup lichen is an ecologically important species of cup lichen that forms continuous mats over large areas of the ground in boreal and arctic regions around the circumpolar north.  The species is a preferred food source of reindeer and caribou during the winter months, and it has an important role in regulating nutrient cycling and soil microbiological communities.  Like many other lichens, Cladonia stellaris is used by humans directly for its chemical properties, as many of the secondary metabolites are antimicrobial (e.g., Usnic acid), but it also has the unique distinction of being harvested and sold as 'fake trees' for model train displays. It is also used as a sound absorber in interior design. The fungal portion of Cladonia stellaris, known as a mycobiont, protects the lichen from lichenivores, superfluous solar radiation, and other kinds of stressors in their ecosystem.

Cladonia stellaris is described as mat-forming and fruticose (shrub-like) in appearance, and as terrestrial, terricolous, or epigeic, because it grows on the surface of bare soil or gravel.  Like most other lichens, Cladonia stellaris grows slowly, averaging less than 0.5 cm per year under good conditions.

This species differs from the similar Cladonia rangiferina and Cladonia arbuscula in that it forms much more distinct cushion-shaped patches, and appears to have denser branching when viewed from above.

See also
List of Cladonia species

References

External links

stellaris
Lichen species
Lichens described in 1823
Lichens of North America
Lichens of Europe
Taxa named by Philipp Maximilian Opiz
Lichens of the Arctic